El mejor tesoro is a 1966 Spanish black and white film directed by Gregorio Almendros.

Cast
 Luis Barbán
 Fernando Bilbao
 Sofía Casares
 Genaro Galindo
 Rafael Hernández
 Antonio Jiménez Escribano
 Ángel Jordán
 José Riesgo
 Javier de Rivera
 Ana Valdi

References

External links
 

Spanish black-and-white films
Films scored by Federico Moreno Torroba
Films shot in Spain